The Mayo–Lewis equation or copolymer equation in polymer chemistry describes the distribution of monomers in a copolymer. It was proposed by Frank R. Mayo and Frederick M. Lewis.

The reactivity ratio for each propagating chain end is defined as the ratio of the rate constant for addition of a monomer of the species already at the chain end to the rate constant for addition of the other monomer.

The copolymer equation is then:

with the concentrations of the components in square brackets. The equation gives the relative instantaneous rates of incorporation of the two monomers.

Equation derivation
Monomer 1 is consumed with reaction rate:

 
with  the concentration of all the active chains terminating in monomer 1, summed over chain lengths.  is defined similarly for monomer 2.

Likewise the rate of disappearance for monomer 2 is:

Division of both equations by  followed by division of the first equation by the second yields:

The ratio of active center concentrations can be found using the steady state approximation, meaning that the concentration of each type of active center remains constant.

The rate of formation of active centers of monomer 1 is equal to the rate of their destruction  so that

or

Substituting into the ratio of monomer consumption rates yields the Mayo–Lewis equation after rearrangement:

Mole fraction form
It is often useful to alter the copolymer equation by expressing concentrations in terms of mole fractions.

Similarly,  represents the mole fraction of each monomer in the copolymer:

These equations can be combined with the Mayo–Lewis equation to give

This equation gives the composition of copolymer formed at each instant. However the feed and copolymer compositions can change as polymerization proceeds.

Limiting cases
Reactivity ratios indicate preference for propagation. From the definition of reactivity ratios, several special cases can be derived:
  If both reactivity ratios are very high, the two monomers only react with themselves and not with each other. This leads to a mixture of two homopolymers.
 . If both ratios are larger than 1, homopolymerization of each monomer is favored. However, in the event of crosspolymerization adding the other monomer, the chain-end will continue to add the new monomer and form a block copolymer.
 . If both ratios are near 1, a given monomer will add the two monomers with comparable speeds and a statistical or random copolymer is formed.
  If both values are near 0, the monomers are unable to homopolymerize. Each can add only the other resulting in an alternating polymer. For example, the copolymerization of maleic anhydride and styrene has reactivity ratios  = 0.01 for maleic anhydride  and  = 0.02 for styrene. Maleic acid in fact does not homopolymerize in free radical polymerization, but will form an almost exclusively alternating copolymer with styrene.
  In the initial stage of the copolymerization, monomer 1 is incorporated faster and the copolymer is rich in monomer 1. When this monomer gets depleted, more monomer 2 segments are added. This is called composition drift.  
 When both , the system has an azeotrope, where feed and copolymer composition are the same.

Calculation of reactivity ratios

Calculation of reactivity ratios generally involves carrying out several polymerizations at varying monomer ratios. The copolymer composition can be analysed with methods such as Proton nuclear magnetic resonance, Carbon-13 nuclear magnetic resonance, or Fourier transform infrared spectroscopy. The polymerizations are also carried out at low conversions, so monomer concentrations can be assumed to be constant. With all the other parameters in the copolymer equation known,  and  can be found.

Curve Fitting

This is preferred as methods such as Kelen-Tüdős or Fineman-Ross (see below) that involve linearization of the Mayo–Lewis equation will introduce bias to the results.

Mayo-Lewis Method

The Mayo-Lewis method uses a form of the copolymer equation relating  to :

For each different monomer composition, a line is generated using arbitrary  values.

Fineman-Ross Method

Fineman and Ross rearranged the copolymer equation into a linear form:

where  and 

Thus, a plot of  versus  yields a straight line with slope  and intercept

Kelen-Tüdős method

The Fineman-Ross method can be biased towards points at low or high monomer concentration, so Kelen and Tüdős introduced an arbitrary constant,

The data can be plotted in a linear form

Plotting  against  yields a straight line that gives  when  and  when . This distributes the data more symmetrically and can yield better results.

Q-e scheme

A semi-empirical method for the prediction of reactivity ratios is called the Q-e scheme which was proposed by Alfrey and Price in 1947. The reaction of 
radical with  monomer is written as

while the reaction of  radical with  monomer is written as

Where P is a proportionality constant, Q is the measure of reactivity of monomer via resonance stabilization, and e is the measure of polarity of monomer (molecule or radical) via the effect of functional groups on vinyl groups. Using these definitions,  and  can be found by the ratio of the terms. An advantage of this system is that reactivity ratios can be found using tabulated Q-e values of monomers regardless of what the monomer pair is in the system.

External links
 copolymers @zeus.plmsc.psu.edu Link

References

Polymer chemistry
Equations